The Herman Skolnik Award is awarded annually by the Division of Chemical Information of the American Chemical Society, "to recognize outstanding contributions to and achievements in the theory and practice of chemical information science".   the award is of 3,000 US dollars.  

It is named for Herman Skolnik (1914-1994), who was a co-founder of the then ACS Division of Chemical Literature in 1948 and a key figure in the Division.  The first award was made to him.

Recipients

1970s
1976: Herman Skolnik
1977: Eugene Garfield
1978: Fred A. Tate

1980s
1980: William J. Wiswesser
1981: Ben H. Weil
1982: Robert Fugmann
1983: Russell J. Rowlett, Jr.
1984: Montagu Hyams
1986: Dale B. Baker
1987: William Theilheimer
1988: David R. Lide, Jr.
1989: Michael F. Lynch and Stuart Marson

1990s
1990: Ernst Meyer
1991: Todd Wipke
1992: Jacques-Emile Dubois
1993: Peter Willett
1994: Alexandru T. Balaban
1995: Reiner Luckenbach and Clemens Jochum
1996: Milan Randic
1997: Johann Gasteiger
1998: Gary D. Wiggins
1999: Stuart M. Kaback

2000s
2000: Stephen R. Heller and G. W. A. Milne
2001: Guenter Grethe
2002: Peter Norton
2003: Frank H. Allen
2004: Peter Johnson
2005: Lorrin Garson
2006: Hugo Kubinyi
2007: Robert S. Pearlman
2008: Gerald M. Maggiora
2009: Yvonne Connolly Martin

2010s
2010: Anton J. Hopfinger
2011: Alexander Lawson
2012: Peter Murray-Rust and Henry Rzepa
2013: Richard D. Cramer
2014: Engelbert Zass
2015: Jürgen Bajorath
2016: Steve Bryant and Evan Bolton
2017: David Winkler
2018: Gisbert Schneider
2019: Kimito Funatsu
2020: Wendy A. Warr

See also

 List of chemistry awards
 List of computer science awards

References

Further reading

Cheminformatics
Information science awards
Awards established in 1976
Awards of the American Chemical Society